El tejedor de milagros ("The Weaver of Miracles") is a 1962 Mexican drama film directed by Francisco del Villar. It was entered into the 12th Berlin International Film Festival.

Cast
 Pedro Armendáriz
 Columba Domínguez
 Begoña Palacios
 Sergio Bustamante
 Enrique Lucero
 Aurora Clavel
 Hortensia Santoveña
 José Gálvez
 José Luis Jiménez
 Pilar Souza
 Fanny Schiller
 Ada Carrasco
 Virginia Manzano
 Sadi Dupeyrón
 Lupe Carriles
 Miguel Suárez
 Victorio Blanco
 Socorro Avelar

References

External links

1962 films
1960s Spanish-language films
1962 drama films
Mexican black-and-white films
Films directed by Francisco del Villar
Mexican drama films
1960s Mexican films